The International School of Azerbaijan (TISA) is located in Baku which is the capital of Azerbaijan. It was founded in 1996. TISA is a non-sectarian, coeducational college preparatory day school. It serves both the expatriate community and those seeking an international education. The language of instruction is English.

The school is accredited by the International Baccalaureate Organization, Council of International Schools and the Ministry of Education in Azerbaijan. TISA offers the IB Primary Years Programme, IB Middle Years Programme and IB Diploma Programme.

The student body is composed of over 50 nationalities. Current enrollment is over 600 students aged from 2 to 18. The school is located in a purpose-built facility in a residential community on the outskirts of Baku.

Students take part in a variety of Central & Eastern European Schools Association (CEESA) and other International events each school year. These include various sports including football, basketball, swimming, and volleyball, as well as extra-curricular activity events such as Speech & Debate and Model United Nations. Each year, TISA hosts international events.

References

Educational institutions established in 1996
International schools in Azerbaijan
Schools in Baku
International Baccalaureate schools in Azerbaijan
International Baccalaureate schools
1996 establishments in Azerbaijan